Ness Ashby Murby (born 4 October 1985) is a Canadian Paralympian (PLY) who competes in Para-Athletics  discus throw and javelin throw.

Career 
Murby has competed in goalball, powerlifting and para-athletics, and has represented Australia, Japan and Canada. He competes in the F11 disability class. Representing Canada, Murby won a silver medal in javelin throw and a bronze medal in discus throw at the 2015 Parapan American Games. Competing in javelin throw, he won a silver medal at the 2015 IPC Athletics World Championships and a bronze medal at the 2017 World Para Athletics Championships, coming sixth in discus throw at the intervening 2016 Summer Paralympics and at the 2019 World Para Athletics Championships. Murby participated in the second season of the AMI documentary series Mind Set Go in 2019. In November 2020, he came out as genderqueer and transmasculine.

In 2023, Murby was the subject of Ness Murby: Transcending, a six-part television documentary series on AMI-tv.

Personal life 
Murby was born on 4 October 1985 in Melbourne, Australia. He was born with limited eyesight, which deteriorated while he was a teenager, and is now blind. Murby lives in Vancouver with his wife Eva Fejes, who met him in Japan. Murby uses he/him pronouns.

References

External links
 
 

1985 births
Living people
Paralympic track and field athletes of Canada
Athletes (track and field) at the 2016 Summer Paralympics
People with non-binary gender identities
Transgender sportspeople
Medalists at the 2015 Parapan American Games
Canadian LGBT sportspeople
Sportspeople from Melbourne
Canadian discus throwers
Canadian javelin throwers
Non-binary sportspeople
LGBT track and field athletes